Albert James Palmer (22 July 1885 – 3 July 1962) was an Australian rules footballer who played for the Geelong Football Club in the Victorian Football League (VFL).

Notes

External links 

1885 births
1962 deaths
Australian rules footballers from Victoria (Australia)
Geelong Football Club players